Sir Frederic William Hewitt M.V.O., (2 July 1857 - 6 January 1916), was an anaesthetist at the London Hospital for 15 years and later to King Edward VII. In 1904 he was listed an honorary member of staff of the King Edward VII's Hospital.

References

External links
Worldcat.org

1857 births
1916 deaths
People from London
19th-century English medical doctors
20th-century English medical doctors